The Mojave Solar Project (MSP) is a concentrated solar power (CSP) facility in the Mojave Desert in California, about  northwest of Barstow. Surrounding the hamlet of Lockhart, Mojave Solar is adjacent to Harper Lake and the SEGS VIII–IX solar plant. 

The site was originally reserved for the planned, never built, SEGS IX and XII. For 15 years following its construction in 1990, SEGS VIII–IX was the largest commercial solar power plant in the world, generating around 160 MW at its peak. It is one of three separately owned sites within  of one another, that make up the nine solar fields in the Solar Electric Generating System (SEGS #1 and 2 are at Daggett, and #3 through 7 are at Kramer Junction). Harper Lake was the last of these built, and is designated as SEGS #8 and 9. It is still online, but has been surpassed by other newer facilities, including the Mojave Solar Project. 

MSP, with a combined nameplate capacity of 250 MW (gross 280 MW), is made of two, independently operable, solar fields. The power plant cost an estimated $1.6 billion in total and entered commercial operation in December 2014. The developer, Abengoa, has successfully secured a $1.2 billion loan guarantee from the US government for the project.
The plant is expected to generate 617,000 MWh of power annually, enough power for more than 88,000 households and to prevent the emission of over 430 kilotons of CO2 a year. Pacific Gas & Electric has agreed to a 25-year power purchase agreement.

The plant was commissioned on 1 December 2014.

Technology

Using the desert's solar thermal energy, the facility generates steam in solar steam generators, which expands through a steam turbine generator to produce electrical power from twin, independently operable solar fields, each feeding a 125 MW power island. Generation is provided 100% from sun, no supplement from fossil-based energy sources. There is a gas-fired auxiliary boiler, for each field, only to provide equipment and heat-transfer fluid (HTF) freeze protection, when temperatures fall below . 

That makes a total of  aperture each solar field,  total for the plant, operating about 3,024 hours per year.

Cooling is provided by wet cooling towers; water for the towers and solar collector washing, is supplied from onsite groundwater wells.

Production 
Mojave Solar Project production is as follows (values in MW·h).

Maximum production was planned at 617,000 MW·h per year.

See also

 List of solar thermal power stations
 Renewable energy in the United States
 Solar power plants in the Mojave Desert
 Solar thermal energy

References

External links
 
 
 

Solar power in the Mojave Desert
Solar power stations in California
Buildings and structures in San Bernardino County, California